"A Girl Like You'" is a song written by Jaren Johnston and Jimmy Robbins, and recorded by Canadian country rock singer Dallas Smith for his first extended play, Tippin' Point (2014). It was serviced to Canadian country radio via 604 Records on June 23, 2014 as the third single from the EP.

Critical reception
Markus Meyer of country music blog The Shotgun Seat praised "A Girl Like You" for subverting expectations and being a love song rather than a degrading lyric. He writes: ""A Girl Like You" isn't deep, but it is well-written and features some clever lines ... Combine that with the solid tempo change throughout ... , a catchy melody and a restrained production, and you have one very enjoyable package." Shenieka Russell-Metcalf of Canadian country blog Top Country called "A Girl Like You" the kind of love song that "every lady wants to have written for her," noting that the song "has a great sound to it and it brings a smile to your face when you hear it."

Music video
The video for "A Girl Like You", directed by Joel Stewart, premiered August 7, 2014 on Smith's official YouTube channel and features a live acoustic rendition of the song. It is Smith's first music video not to be directed by Stephano Barberis.

Chart performance
"A Girl Like You" debuted at number 82 on the Billboard Canadian Hot 100 for the week ending August 2, 2014.

References

2014 songs
2014 singles
Dallas Smith songs
604 Records singles
Republic Nashville singles
Songs written by Jaren Johnston
Songs written by Jimmy Robbins
Song recordings produced by Joey Moi
Republic Records singles